Erika von Heiland (born December 24, 1965) is an American badminton player, born in the Philippines. She competed in women's singles at the 1992 Summer Olympics in Barcelona, and in singles and doubles at the 1996 Summer Olympics.

References

External links

1965 births
Living people
American female badminton players
Olympic badminton players of the United States
Badminton players at the 1992 Summer Olympics
Badminton players at the 1996 Summer Olympics
People from Angeles City
Pan American Games medalists in badminton
Pan American Games bronze medalists for the United States
Badminton players at the 1995 Pan American Games
Medalists at the 1995 Pan American Games
21st-century American women